P2Y may refer to:

Consolidated P2Y, a flying boat maritime patrol aircraft
P2Y receptor, a family of G protein-coupled receptors
Power-to-X